Stephen F. Keating (1918–2001) was an American technology executive.   He served as President of Honeywell from 1965 to 1974.  He followed James H. Binger as President, which was an attempt to provide stability and continuity at Honeywell.  A graduate of the University of Minnesota and the University of Minnesota Law School, Keating also practiced law, served in the FBI, and served as CEO of Toro (company).  He was also Chairman of the Federal Reserve Bank of Minneapolis from 1979 to 1981.

Influence
Keating was a member of the Minnesota Business Partnership, and provided leadership in The Urban Coalition.

References

Honeywell people
Minnesota lawyers
University of Minnesota alumni
University of Minnesota Law School alumni
1918 births
2001 deaths
20th-century American lawyers
American chief executives